Karla Johanna Jaramillo Navarrate (born 21 January 1997) is an Ecuadorian racewalking athlete. She won a gold medal in 20 km walk at the 2019 South American Championships in Athletics, setting Ecuadorian record and South American record in 20 km track walk. She placed eighth in women's 20 kilometres walk at the 2019 Pan American Games. Representing Ecuador at the 2019 World Athletics Championships, she placed 18th in the women's 20 kilometres walk.

She represented Ecuador at the 2020 Summer Olympics.

References

External links

Ecuadorian female racewalkers
1997 births
Living people
World Athletics Championships athletes for Ecuador
Pan American Games competitors for Ecuador
Athletes (track and field) at the 2019 Pan American Games
Athletes (track and field) at the 2014 Summer Youth Olympics
South American Championships in Athletics winners
Athletes (track and field) at the 2020 Summer Olympics
People from Ibarra, Ecuador
Olympic athletes of Ecuador
20th-century Ecuadorian women
21st-century Ecuadorian women